Norman's Awesome Experience is a 1989 Canadian-Argentine time travel adventure comedy film written and directed by Paul Donovan. It was shot in 1987 and 1988 in San Martín de los Andes under the working title Normanicus.

Originally scheduled to be released as A Switch in Time, the film was retitled to capitalize on the success of Bill & Ted's Excellent Adventure (also released in 1989). In spite of its seeming derivative nature, Norman's Awesome Experience is notable for breaking new ground in the subgenre for a variety of artistic choices.

Plot
In modern-day Switzerland, Norman (Tom McCamus) is a nebbish Canadian junior scientist working at a local nuclear power plant which his life takes a whole turn when an attractive Canadian model named Erica (Lori Paton) and her Italian photographer boyfriend Umberto (Jacques Lussier) persuade him to allow them access to the plant for a photo shoot. The next day, the three central characters are literally zapped back in time by a freak accident at the nuclear power plant in which none of them was an active participant. The three of them find themselves in an open field in the distant past at the exact spot where the nuclear power plant from the 20th century was. Their presence was not known to the scientists nearby, and time-travel was not the intent of the experiment at the nuclear facility. Therefore, Norman and his two friends are completely unable to return to their own time and they do not even bother seeking an attempt to get back, nor do they concern themselves with the possibility of changing history.

The area is about to be annexed by the Roman Empire at the time the protagonists arrive (during the reign of the Emperor Nero). The Roman soldiers who capture Norman, Erica, and Umberto actually speak Latin (presented with English subtitles). Only Umberto can speak Latin and is therefore able to effectively communicate and function in the society. The three are taken to a small village where several dozen local Gallic people native to the area live. But most of them speak a primitive tongue requiring Norman to communicate in gestures.

Finally, in addition to learning the ability to converse in Latin, Norman has a rudimentary technical understanding of many modern devices and is able to use his knowledge to actively alter history. Norman and the others stage a revolt and defeat the Roman soldiers garrisoning the village. But weeks later, a massive Roman army arrives to destroy the rebelling village in accordance with the Roman laws that all persons partaking in a revolt against the Roman Empire are to be put to death. Seeing to save themselves, Erica and Umberto attempt to flee only to be captured by the Romans. To save their own lives, the model and photographer become collaborators with the Romans to help put down the revolt that Norman has now taken over as the village's de facto leader, with the villagers naming him "Caesar Normanicus".

The film ends with the Roman Army launching a massive attack against the village, but Norman and most of the villagers manage to escape by using hot air balloons. This activity is witnessed by the Roman commanding officer and the images of the balloons makes it into a book that Umberto and Erica are forced to help manufacture on a primitive printing press operated by a group of galley slaves of which they are now a part, having been sold into slavery due to their failure to stop Norman. Erica and Umberto live out the rest of their lives as slaves.

The villagers settle on a coastal area of Gaul safe from the Romans; Norman names the region Normandy and lives out the rest of his life with his new people in prosperity, and thus seals his name in History.

External links
 
 

1989 films
Films about time travel
Latin-language films
1980s science fiction comedy films
Films set in the 1st century
Films set in Gaul
Films set in the Roman Empire
1989 comedy films
Canadian science fiction comedy films
Films directed by Paul Donovan
1980s Canadian films